Royal Highness is the debut studio album released by Orange County, CA, hip hop group Kottonmouth Kings. It was released on August 11, 1998 under Suburban Noize Records and Capitol Records. Rappers on this album are Saint Dog, D-Loc, and Daddy X.
This album include guest appearances by Daddy X's other band, Humble Gods, along with Dog Boy from the band Too Rude.  The album peaked at number 17 on Billboard's Top Heatseekers chart on 15 January 2000. The song "Bump" peaked at number 28 on the Hot Modern Rock Tracks chart. In a 2015 interview with Johnny Richter he stated that he was a member of the group but was not featured on it due to a personal issue with a member of the group at the time of the album's release date.

Track listing 

Early versions of the CD included Pimp Twist  as track 18 and did not include Bump (remix – radio edit)

"Suburban Life" was on the soundtrack for the movie Scream 2, and was even featured (briefly) in the movie itself.

"Dog's Life" was on the soundtrack for the movie Lost and Found and an exclusive music video was made which is quite hard to find. Also Dog's Life was used in the PlayStation game Test Drive 6 (Released 1999).

On the back of the album, the running time for each track is given as 4:20

Sayings from Spike Xavier (aka Corporate Avenger) were included in the booklet and cited to "Corprit Avenger"

All songs written by Kottonmouth Kings, except "Bump" by Kottonmouth Kings, Joseph Bishara, and Marco Forcone; and "Dog's Life" by Kottonmouth Kings, Roger Miller, and Spike Xavier.

Personnel
Daddy X – Vocals
D-Loc – Vocals
Saint Dog – Vocals
Lou Dogg – Drums, Percussion
DJ Bobby B – DJ, Engineer, Programmer, Turntables
Humble Gods – Vocals
Dog Boy – Vocals
Eric E-Man Adger – Programmer
 AK Bros – Programmer

References 

Kottonmouth Kings albums
1998 albums
Suburban Noize Records albums
Capitol Records albums